Jeremiah Michael Murphy (born 23 September 1959) is a retired professional footballer who played as a midfielder in the League for Crystal Palace and Chelsea before moving into non-league football with Fisher Athletic. Born in England, he made three appearances for the Republic of Ireland national team.

Career
Murphy started out with Terry Venables' Crystal Palace, spending nine years at Selhurst Park during which time he won the FA Youth Cup in both 1977 and 1978 as part of the famous "Team of the Eighties". The club were then promoted to the First Division in Murphy's first full season in the side, but were relegated after two seasons in the top flight. However, Murphy remained with Palace winning the "Player of the Year" award in 1983.

He moved back to the top flight again, joining Chelsea on a free transfer in the summer of 1985.

He scored in a 1–1 draw at Everton which put Chelsea briefly top of the league. The daily mirror's back page headline the next day was "Jerry and the Pacemakers". His time at Stamford Bridge was affected by lack of form and injury problems. In three seasons he made only 34 league appearances and his contract was cancelled due to injury in March 1988. He joined non-league side Fisher Athletic to finish his career.

See also
 List of Republic of Ireland international footballers born outside the Republic of Ireland

References

External links
 
 

1959 births
Living people
Republic of Ireland association footballers
English footballers
Footballers from Stepney
Association football midfielders
Republic of Ireland international footballers
English Football League players
National Soccer League (Australia) players
Crystal Palace F.C. players
Chelsea F.C. players
Wollongong Wolves FC players
Fisher Athletic F.C. players
Blacktown City FC players
Republic of Ireland expatriate association footballers
Irish expatriate sportspeople in Australia
Expatriate soccer players in Australia